"Let's Go" is a song by American rapper Trick Daddy, released as the first single from his 2004 sixth studio album Thug Matrimony: Married to the Streets. It features Twista and Lil Jon and was produced by Jim Jonsin and Bigg D. The song became a top ten hit, reaching number 7 on the Billboard Hot 100, making it Trick Daddy's most successful single of his career. The song samples "Crazy Train" by Ozzy Osbourne. It was used in the films Stomp the Yard (2007) and Neighbors (2014) in addition to the extended trailer for Megamind (2010) and the theatrical trailer for Jumanji: The Next Level (2019). In 2019, the song is heard during the trailer for a new mode in Gears 5 called Escape. Despite the sample already being cleared with Osbourne's publishing, Osbourne never heard the song until February 2021 when producer Andrew Watt played him the song to his approval.

A remix of the song that is completely produced by Lil Jon is featured on the bonus CD of Lil Jon & the Eastside Boyz' album Crunk Juice. It is not to be confused with the song of the same name by Travis Barker, which also featured Twista and Lil Jon.

Charts

Weekly charts

Year-end charts

Release history

References

2004 songs
2004 singles
Trick Daddy songs
Twista songs
Lil Jon songs
Rap rock songs
Song recordings produced by Jim Jonsin
Songs written by Trick Daddy
Songs written by Twista
Songs written by Lil Jon
Songs written by Bob Daisley
Songs written by Ozzy Osbourne
Songs written by Randy Rhoads
Music videos directed by Erik White